Shah Alam Antlers Football Club is a Malaysian semi-professional football club based in Shah Alam, Selangor, that competes in the Klang Valley League, which is part of Malaysia M4 League, the 4th tier of the Malaysian football league system. Founded in September 2016, the club's home ground is Panasonic Sports Complex Stadium or Antlersland in Seksyen 21, Shah Alam.

Antlers had their first silverware in 2017, when they won the Klang Valley League in their debut season. They finished the league with an unbeaten run of 14 wins and 1 draw.

Rivalries and local derby 
Shah Alam Antlers has a rivalry with the other club from the city, Shah Alam United. This rivalry is known as the "Shah Alam Derby".

Stadium

Shah Alam Antlers are based at JKR Stadium, located in Seksyen 17, Shah Alam, where they also train. The stadium can currently hold a maximum capacity of about 400 people.

Sponsorship
Shah Alam Antlers are sponsored by a number of firms in different kinds of fields. These sponsorships also include partnerships in taking the club to higher levels.

In terms of venue, Shah Alam Antlers are sponsored by MBSA, the owners of their stadium where they play their home matches. 100plus is the official isotonic drink sponsor for the club, agreeing to a one-year sponsorship in late 2016. To engage with people online and boost their popularity, Shah Alam Antlers also have media partnerships with Asiana.my, an agency well known in Malaysia for sports photography and SemuanyaBola, a famous football online portal in Malaysia. Shah Alam Antlers also have a partnership with Homebois Hub where they make merchandises such as t-shirts, scarves and other club related merchandises.

Honours

League 

Fourth Division: Klang Valley League

 Winners (1):  2017

Managements & Official
 President: Ahmad Suffian Mamat

Team officials
 Team manager: Khairul Effendy
 Head coach: Arif Hashim
 Assistant head coach: Ibrahim Madaki
 Goalkeeper Coach: Redzuan Harun
 Coach: Ajib Hashim
 Head physio: Amirul Khairi

Players

Current squad

References

External links
 Official website
 SAAFC on Twitter

Football clubs in Malaysia
Shah Alam
Sport in Selangor